NovelAI is an online cloud-based, SaaS model, paid subscription service for AI-assisted storywriting and text-to-image synthesis, originally launched in beta on June 15, 2021, with the image generation feature later implemented on October 3, 2022. NovelAI is operated by Anlatan, based in Delaware.

Features

NovelAI uses a custom implementation of the source-available Stable Diffusion text-to-image diffusion model that is specifically trained on a Danbooru-based dataset to generate images from text prompts, and GPT-based models to generate storywriting prose. There is also the ability to generate a new image based on an existing image. The NovelAI terms of service states that all generated content belong to the user, regardless if the user is an individual or a corporation. Anlatan states that generated images are not stored locally on their servers.

Reception

Immediately following implementation of its image generation functionality, NovelAI became a widely discussed topic in Japan, with some online commentators noting that its image synthesis features are very adept at producing close impressions of anime characters, including lolicon and shotacon imagery, while others have expressed concern that it is a paid service that is reliant on a diffusion model where the original machine learning training data consists of images used without the consent of the original artists. Attorney Kosuke Terauchi notes that, since a revision of the law in 2018, it is no longer illegal in Japan for machine learning models to scrape copyrighted content from the internet to use as training data; meanwhile, in the United States where NovelAI is based, there is no specific legal framework which regulates machine learning, and thus the fair use doctrine of US copyright law applies instead. Danbooru has posted an official statement in regards to NovelAI's use of the site's content for AI training, expressing that Danbooru is not affiliated with NovelAI, and does not endorse nor condone NovelAI's use of artists' artworks for machine learning.

FayerWayer described NovelAI as a service capable of generating hentai. Manga artist Izumi Ū commented that while the manga style art generated by NovelAI is highly accurate, there are still imperfections in the output, although he views these as human-like in a favourable light nonetheless.

In response to the topic of NovelAI, Narugami, founder of the Japanese freelance artist commissioning website Skeb, stated on October 5, 2022 that the use of AI image generation is prohibited on the platform since 2018. Illustrations using NovelAI have been posted on social media and illustration posting sites, and by October 13, 2,111 works tagged with #NovelAI were posted on Pixiv. Pixiv has stated that it is not considering a complete elimination of creations that use AI, though it requires AI-generated posts to be marked as such and allows users to filter them out.

Incidents
On October 6, 2022, NovelAI experienced a data breach where its software source code was leaked.

See also
15.ai
AI Dungeon
Character.ai
DALL-E
DreamBooth
Midjourney
Stable Diffusion

References

External links

2021 software
Anime and manga fandom
Deep learning software applications
Text-to-image generation
Unsupervised learning